Eldad Tarmu is an American vibraphonist, composer, and music educator. Between 2005 and 2009 he was a professor of Jazz Studies at the Richard Oschanitzky Jazz and Pop School of Tibiscus University in Timișoara, Romania, where he led the Jazz Department. In 2006, he established a partnership with the American Cultural Center in Bucharest, aiming to strengthen cultural ties between Romania and the US and promote jazz as an American art form. He resides in the New York area, where he performs regularly on the jazz and contemporary classical scene.

Early life
Eldad Tarmu was born in Los Angeles, California, shortly after his parents, Yehuda Tarmu and Galya Pillin-Tarmu, graphic artists initially based in Israel, moved to the US. Yehuda Tarmu was a painter and documentary film director of Polish-Jewish origin. He met Chicago-native Galya Pillin in Tel Aviv. Galya was a painter and textile artist whose parents, small-business owners, were immigrants of Ukrainian-Jewish origin, and the sister of poet William Pillin.

Career
After a few years of touring with local bands as a rock drummer, he pursued undergraduate studies at Tel Aviv University in Israel. Upon returning to the US, he started working on his first original jazz records and doing international tours. In 2002, he enrolled in graduate studies, and in 2005 he received a master’s degree in Afro-Latin Music from California State University Los Angeles. Tarmu also holds a Master of Arts in Classical Composition and a doctorate in Jazz Performance from Stony Brook University in New York.

Tarmu has worked with Ron Affif, Ray Anderson, Mike Clark, Billy Higgins, Freddie Hubbard, Taj Mahal, Frank Morgan, Poncho Sanchez, Cybill Shepherd, and Ernie Watts. He has performed in over twenty-five countries in various festivals and concert tours.

His album Get Up Close was number 20 on the U.S. Jazz radio charts for four weeks. His first chamber music album, Songs for the Queen of Bohemia, released in 2007, while jazz-oriented, features a string quartet from the Timișoara Philharmonic, Romanian bassist Johnny Bota, and British-Israeli drummer Yoni Halevy. The eclectic project crosses jazz and Middle Eastern with chamber ensemble arrangements

In 2017 he released a second chamber music record, under 4-Tay Records, in the contemporary classical genre, called Stained Glass Stories, which was nominated for a Grammy Award.

A new album of jazz originals, called Tarmu Jazz Quartet, is scheduled for release in early 2023.

Discography
 Aluminum Forest (USA, 1998)
 Get Up Close (Rhombus, 2001)
 Visits (Fever Pitch, 2003)
 Exotic Tales (Verytall, 2005)
 Songs for the Queen of Bohemia (Queen of Bohemia, 2009)
 Stained Glass Stories (Queen of Bohemia, 2017)
 Farewell, St. George (Queen of Bohemia, 2022)
 Tarmu Jazz Quartet (Queen of Bohemia, 2023)

References

External links
 {
 
 Eldad Tarmu's Flying South Latin Jazz Ensemble.(music group)(Artículo breve) - Latin Beat Magazine | HighBeam Research 
 Los Angeles Times: Archives – Valley Life; jazz riffs; Melody Maker; Vibraphonist Eldad Tarmu plays ear-friendly standards and originals 

1960 births
Living people
Musicians from Los Angeles
American jazz composers
American jazz vibraphonists
Jazz musicians from California
American male jazz composers